Boris Berian (born December 19, 1992) is an American middle distance runner. He was the 2016 National Champion and represented the United States at the 2016 IAAF World Indoor Championships in the 800 meters where he won the gold medal. He set his indoor best winning the world championships at 1:45.87, boldly front running a sub-50 first 400. Outdoors he set his personal best 1:43.34 at the 2015 Herculis meet. In his collegiate career, Berian ran for Adams State University, where he was coached by Damon Martin. Barely a year before the Herculis meet, Berian was working in a Colorado Springs McDonald's as a college dropout, still trying to train after working the morning shift.

Running career

High school
Berian, a Colorado Springs native, attended Widefield High School, where he graduated in 2011. During high school, he ran all the sprinting events, and also occasionally ran the 800 meters. Berian was the Colorado state champion two years a row at 400 meters and recorded high school personal bests of 46.9 for 400 meters and 1:52 for 800 meters.

Collegiate
While running at Adams State, he won both the 2012 NCAA Men's Division II Indoor Track and Field Championships and NCAA Men's Division II Outdoor Track and Field Championships at 800 meters.  His wins helped the team win the outdoor championship and was runner up indoors. Adams State coach Joe Vigil recommended Berian to the Big Bear Track Club, a small track club formed by Carlos Handler around another aspiring unheralded former collegiate athlete, his wife, Brenda Martinez. In that year of training he improved to become the #5 American 800 meter runner of all time.

Professional
Berian experienced a breakout year in 2016. After winning the US Indoor Championship over 800m, he went on to win the World Indoor Championship over the same distance. During the outdoor season, Berian won the 800m at the Prefontaine Classic before finishing runner-up to Clayton Murphy at the US Olympic Trials. He then reached the final of the 800m at the Rio Olympic Games where he finished in last place.

Endorsement controversy
In early 2016, Berian received an offer sheet from New Balance with terms he found agreeable.  Berian's contract with Nike had expired on 12/31/15 but Nike retained the right to match a competitor's term sheet for 180 days.  Nike indicated that they would match the New Balance offer and then sued him for breach of contract when he wouldn't sign with Nike.  Berian argued that Nike failed to match the New Balance offer; both Nike and New Balance offered him $125,000 per year for three years, but the Nike offer included large reductions if Berian failed to meet expectations, while the New Balance offer contained no such reductions. Nike claimed they were prepared to fully match the New Balance contract but Berian's agent, Merhawi Keflezighi, did not communicate its terms to them adequately. In early June 2016, Portland district judge Marco Hernandez approved Nike's request to temporarily prohibit Berian from competing in New Balance gear. Nike's claims that reductions were an industry standard were contradicted by several of its rivals, including Oiselle, Brooks and New Balance. Hernandez was expected to make his next ruling on the matter after a hearing on June 21, but decided to delay it for a week; he did not extend the injunction against Berian competing in New Balance gear, which expired, and his comments in court indicated he felt that Nike had failed to match the New Balance offer. Nike, which had received negative publicity as a result of the controversy, dropped the lawsuit at that point.

References

External links

Vice Sports feature on Boris Berian 

Living people
1992 births
American male middle-distance runners
Sportspeople from Colorado Springs, Colorado
Sportspeople from San Bernardino County, California
Athletes (track and field) at the 2016 Summer Olympics
Olympic track and field athletes of the United States
People from Big Bear Lake, California
USA Indoor Track and Field Championships winners
World Athletics Indoor Championships winners